Jerry Finkelstein (January 26, 1916 – November 28, 2012) was an American publisher, businessman and political insider.  Among his publications were the New York Law Journal and The Hill. He was the father of former New York City Council President Andrew Stein.

Early life and education
Finkelstein was born to a Jewish family, the son of Albert Finkelstein, a small business owner in Manhattan. He attended George Washington High School and New York University. He graduated in 1938 from the New York Law School.

Career and political influence
After graduating from law school in 1938, instead of taking the bar exam, Finkelstein worked as a reporter at the New York Daily Mirror. In 1939, along with Arthur Brisbane's son, Seward Brisbane; he founded a newspaper called The Civil Service Leader, with public employees as the target audience. He ran unsuccessfully for the New York State Senate in 1942, the only time he ran for office. In 1949, Finkelstein successfully managed William O'Dwyer's mayoral re-election campaign; the following year, O'Dwyer appointed him director of the New York City Department of City Planning. In that role he frequently clashed with Robert Moses, who was successful in forcing him out after O'Dwyer resigned. In 1955 he opened a public relations firm; two years later, he merged with another public relations firm owned by Tex McCrary and Jinx Falkenburg. The resultant firm became a major force in financial public relations; after becoming the subject of a Securities and Exchange Commission investigation for insider trading, it was dissolved.

Finkelstein became chairman of Struthers Wells in 1961. He purchased the New York Law Journal in 1963 for $1 million. John F. Kennedy appointed him Chairman of the Fine Arts Gift Committee of the National Cultural Center (later, the Kennedy Center for the Performing Arts). In 1972, he was named commissioner of the Port Authority of New York and New Jersey by New York governor Nelson Rockefeller.

Finkelstein helped fundraising efforts by John F. Kennedy and Robert F. Kennedy, and also helped President Lyndon B. Johnson. His backing was instrumental in the election of his son, Andrew, to the New York State Assembly in 1968 (at the age of 23). Though a lifelong Democrat, he was also a key supporter of Republican Nelson Rockefeller's gubernatorial and presidential campaigns.

Personal life and death
In 1942 Finkelstein married Shirley Marks, to whom he remained married until her death in 2003. He had two sons, Andrew Stein and James Finkelstein (married and divorced from Cathy Frank, daughter of Sidney Frank and granddaughter of Lewis Rosenstiel). Finkelstein died on November 28, 2012, at his home in Manhattan. He was 96.

References

1916 births
2012 deaths
20th-century American Jews
American newspaper publishers (people)
American political fundraisers
American reporters and correspondents
Businesspeople from New York City
George Washington Educational Campus alumni
New York (state) Democrats
People from Manhattan
Journalists from New York City
20th-century American businesspeople
21st-century American Jews